MFAP4 (microfibril-associated glycoprotein 4) is an extracellular matrix protein encoded by the MFAP4 gene. It is part of the MFAP family of proteoglycans, which are involved in cell adhesion, intercellular interactions and the assembly and/or maintenance of elastic fibres.

MFAP4 is known to co-localise at sites rich in elastic fibres and is thought to interact with several proteins including FBN1, FBN2, tropoelastin and desmosine. It has a relatively non-specific tissue expression pattern, with higher levels observed in organs such as the lungs and vasculature.


Clinical relevance 
Using MFAP4-deficient mouse models, studies have shown roles for MFAP4 in neointima formation and asthma.

Moreover, it has recently been shown that the glycosylation of MFAP4 is raised in the aortic extracellular matrix of Marfan syndrome patients using proteomics and gene expression levels of MFAP4 correlate with alterations in extracellular matrix genes within human aortic vascular smooth muscle cells.

Potential biomarker 
MFAP4 has received considerable attention as a possible biomarker for many conditions including Marfan syndrome, surgical repair of abdominal aortic aneurysms, cardiovascular disease, COPD, liver fibrosis, and various cancers.

References 

Extracellular matrix proteins
Proteoglycans
Genes on human chromosome 17